A permission slip is a form that a school or other organization sends home with a student to a parent in which the parent provides authorization for minors to travel under the auspices of the school or organization for an event, such as a field trip.

Permission slips are required by law in many places in order for an organization to be allowed to take a student on a trip. While laws vary by jurisdiction, they are generally present in accordance with the laws minors must be given by their parents or legal guardians to be transported by another adult.

Information that may be found on a permission slip may include the student's name, the location where the field trip will occur, and emergency contact info.

Application to adult students at a school

Some schools allow students who have reached the age of majority to sign their own permission slips; other schools continue to require that the parent of the student must still sign the form.  Many adult students object to a continued requirement for parental signature, since there is no legal necessity for adults to obtain authorization from their parents to travel or participate in any activity.

School terminology